Larry Hsien Ping Lang (a.k.a. Larry Lang, Larry H.P. Lang, Lang Xianping, and Lang Hsien-ping) (born 1956) is a Hong Kong-based economist, commentator, author and TV host in China.

Lang has become a famous and controversial figure in China in recent years:
Since 2002, Lang has risen to his fame by "scolding".  From D'Long to Haier, from TCL to Greencool, those scolded by him were all well-known large enterprises.  People who hate him call him a "Rogue Professor", whereas those who like him say he dares to speak the truth.

Personal background 

Lang was born in 1956 in Taoyuan County, Taiwan (now Taoyuan City), and his ancestors are from Weifang, Shandong.

Education 

Lang received his bachelor's degree from Tunghai University in 1978, and his master's degree from National Taiwan University in 1980.  He then studied at Wharton School of the University of Pennsylvania, where he received a master's degree and a PhD in Finance.

Lang was a lecturer at Wharton School of the University of Pennsylvania, Michigan State University, Ohio State University, New York University Stern School of Business and The University of Chicago.  Lang was also Chair Professor of Finance, the Faculty of Business Administration, at The Chinese University of Hong Kong.

Career and professional ethics 

1994: Professor at The Chinese University of Hong Kong.

1996–2000: Consultant on Corporate governance Projects for World Bank, Washington, D.C.

1998–2001: Shenzhen Stock Exchange, and the Financial Services Bureau of the Hong Kong Government.  He researched corporate governance and protection of the interests of small shareholders.

2004: Joint-appointed professor of The Chinese University of Hong Kong and the Cheung Kong Graduate School of Business in mainland China.

August 2004: Host of a finance talk show Cáijīng Láng Xiánpáng (财经郎闲评, literally "Finance Lang Leisure Talk") on Shanghai Television

Early 2006: Cáijīng Láng Xiánpáng suspended due to Lang's intention to uncover the Shanghai pension scandal on the show.

June 2009: Lang made a comeback to host Larry's Eyes on Finance, a news commentary talk show.

Controversy 
Much of the controversy surrounding Lang can be attributed to his criticism on rightwing capitalism and the failing financial system. For example, Lang openly announced his endorsement of Marx's critical analysis on capitalism, positively reviewed Mao Zedong's role in China's earlier development and pointed out the often negative role US played in global economy and financial world.

Impact to the public domain in mainland China

Major public events 

 (TODO: This section needs to be translated from Chinese.)

Main theories on public media 

Lang has repeatedly stated in public that, regarding macroeconomics, he believes in Karl Marx's scientific communism and crisis theory.  He thinks that big government can bring more justice and welfare to the society than minarchism, which condones violations on the interests of small shareholders by financial capital, and eventually leading to financial crisis.  That is why he is sometimes called a New Left academic.

Dual-sector model 

 (TODO: This section needs to be translated from Chinese.)

China's globalization crisis 

 (TODO: This section needs to be translated from Chinese.)  
For China 's globalization remained relatively "critical " attitude. His main idea is that many Chinese enterprises and local governments do not understand the international nature, or in his words, " farmland through water not previously dug ditches ." For example, "foreign" stock market operations through the acquisition of a cheap price or a lot of state-owned assets, causing increasingly serious loss of assets, as well as the division of labor in global value chain.

The face of the increasing appreciation of international oil prices in 2008, prices of food and some money, Lang pointed out that it is likely to be a behind by the " international financial speculators " under the control of a situation. The Chinese part of the industry, such as the steel industry is severely affected.

Enterprise strategy 

Lang repeatedly points to South Korean enterprises as a model, and criticizes many of China's emerging enterprises. He advocates studying the practices of transnational corporations, of cutting process flow in enterprises where enterprises no longer tangled in one or two leadership capacity, maintaining long-term business, but also full of innovation.

 (TODO: This section needs to be translated from Chinese.)

Social repercussions

Reactions in the Chinese business community 

 (TODO: This section needs to be translated from Chinese.)

Reactions among Chinese economists 

Among circles of Chinese economists, the prevailing opinion is that Lang's area of expertise does not cover China's economic system: he lacks a true understanding of China's situation, and his views on the restructuring of state enterprises are mostly shunned by his peers.  Initially, key economists remained silent, but then they realized that Lang seemed to be on the way to affect China's fundamental national policies.  So, they began to criticize his theories to try to turn the tide.  Besides academic criticisms, there were also accusations of "grandstanding" and "fishing for fame."  Nevertheless, it would appear that their attempts in turning the tide were basically futile.

 Wu Jinglian:Lang's final verdict is "China's society has never been this bad in 5000 years."  His rationale is two-fold: first, the path of economic development alone, and second, marketization.  (TODO: Some text in this paragraph still needs to be translated into Chinese and is commented out.) 
 Steven N. S. Cheung: Professor Lang knows nearly nothing about China's economic and political infrastructure. ... However, as a professor, how could Mr. Lang make such generalizations so irresponsibly?
 Zhou Qiren: Speaking of Lang, I think it is not difficult to see that he is wrong. ... I do not see in Lang's allegations any kind of complex theories, concepts and reasoning. ... Lang [claimed], "Whose are the state-owned assets? Yours, mine, ours." ... Now what is he muddling?  He has no share of nothing.  No matter how blurry the property rights of state-owned assets are, it should be obvious that he has no part in the subject of rights. ... I can say with certainty that these outrageous views of Lang's did not just come off the top of his head.  The question beckons: These "stuff"—nonsensical, illogical, and just plain rude—came off the top of whose head?
 Zhiwu Chen thinks that Lang's conspiracy theory is the opium of the people.

Reactions of relevant departments in the Chinese government 

 (TODO: This section needs to be translated from Chinese.)  

Since the Lang–Gu dispute, ...

Commentaries from Chinese activist private scholars 

Lang is often thought of as a New Left academic, but he calls himself a capitalist economist. Lang was never admitted by the Utopia as an ally.

 (TODO: This section needs to be translated from Chinese.)

Notable works

Doctoral thesis

Selected books for general audiences 
 East Asian Corporation: Heroes or Villains? (with S. Claessens and S. Djankov, 2000)
 Corporate Governance (2004)
 Governance and Expropriation (editor, 2005)
 Manipulation (2006)
 Operation (2006)
 
 
 
 Larry Hsien Ping Lang Says: Why We Live So Hard? (2010)

 (TODO: Some more titles of Lang's works may need to be translated from Chinese.)

Selected journal articles 
 "Dividends and Expropriation" (with Mara Faccio and Leslie Young, American Economic Review, 2001)
 "When Does Corporate Diversification Matter to Productivity and Performance? Evidence from East Asia" (with S. Claessens and J. Fan, Pacific-Basin Finance Journal, Special Issue on Corporate Governance, July 2003)
 "Disentangling the Incentive and entrenchment Effects of Large Shareholdings" (with S. Claessens, S. Djankov and J. Fan, Journal of Finance, December 2003)

References

External links 
 Larry Lang's profile from CUHK
 Lang's blog 

20th-century Taiwanese economists
National Taiwan University alumni
1956 births
Living people
Writers from Taoyuan City
Tunghai University alumni
Wharton School of the University of Pennsylvania alumni
Hong Kong economists
21st-century male writers
Taiwanese male writers
Taiwanese emigrants to Hong Kong
Academic staff of the Chinese University of Hong Kong
21st-century Taiwanese economists
Chinese New Left